Melis Alphan (Melis Çelebi: 1978, İzmir), is a Turkish journalist and author known for her women's rights activism and her fashion journalism.

Education 
Following her graduation from the American College Institute in Izmir, she studied Fashion at the London College of Fashion from where she earned a BSc. Following she studied for a while at the Fashion Institute of Technology in New York. In 2001 she returned to Turkey and initiated her journalistic career at the Vizyon magazine. The same year she began working at the newspaper Radikal and by 2003 she received a job at the Milliyet newspaper. In 2009 she started to work at the Hürriyet newspaper, for which she reported for 9 years. She wrote articles on women rights, fashion amongst other issues and with time she became one of the few female journalists to write an own column in a Turkish newspaper. In 2019 she published the book I Will – Inspiring Life Stories.

Legal prosecution 
In November 2020 an investigation into an Instagram post of her about the Kurdish new year celebrations in Diyarbakır in 2015 was initiated. In the photograph in question, a flag of the Kurdistan Workers' Party, with which the Turkish Government at the time was holding peace negotiations was also to be seen. The prosecution demanded a prison sentence for up to 7 years and 6 months. She was acquitted on May 21, 2021.

Award 

 2013, Traditional Turkey Journalism Awards in the category "Best Interview"

References 

Turkish journalists
1978 births
Living people
Turkish women's rights activists